Michael Raymond "Mike" Brunker is an Australian politician currently serving as Whitsunday Regional Councillor for Division 6, a position he has held since 2016. He previously served as the first mayor of Whitsunday Region from 2008 to 2012, and mayor of the Shire of Bowen for 11 years from 1997 until its amalgamation with Whitsunday Shire in 2008. He was first elected to local government as a Bowen Shire councillor in 1994.

Brunker is a member of the Australian Labor Party and was the endorsed Labor candidate for the 2010 Australian federal election for the Division of Dawson, for the Electoral district of Burdekin at the 2017 Queensland state election and again for the 2020 Queensland state election.

References

Mayors of places in Queensland
Living people
Year of birth missing (living people)
Australian Labor Party councillors